Brada may refer to:

In people
 Brada (writer), pseudonym of Henrietta Consuelo Sansom (1847-1938), French writer
 Slobodan Praljak, Croatian war criminal

In other
 Brada-Rybníček, a municipality with an abandoned castle Brada near Jičín, Czech Republic
 Brada (polychaete), a genus of polychaete worm in family Flabelligeridae